is a Japanese television entertainer, former baseball player and Youtuber. He pitched many innings in his high school career. The Japan High School Baseball Federation was afraid that he would injure his arm, so they set a new rematch rule in 1958. However, he pitched 18 innings in a 1958 quarterfinal game, which resulted in the first rematch in the National High School Baseball Championship. He reached the final, but didn't win. His record of 83 strikeouts in the tournament remains unbroken. He joined Chunichi Dragons but it is said that he didn't regain his pitching strength. He can't extend his elbow even now.

Works

Singles 
 "Moeyo Dragons!" – 1974

Information 
 Doyō Daisuki! 830 (Kansai TV) – 1987–1997

Variety show 
 Sunday Dragons (CBC) – 1983––present
 Unbelievable (Fuji TV) – 1997–1998

Game show 
 Sekai Fushigi Hakken! (TBS) – 1986––present
 Magical Brain Power !!  (Nippon TV) – 1990–1999, 2001

References 

1940 births
Japanese male actors
Baseball people from Tokushima Prefecture
Japanese baseball players
Nippon Professional Baseball pitchers
Chunichi Dragons players
Japanese people from Manchukuo
Living people
Former Stardust Promotion artists